O'Connor's Gunners was a short lived strike force established by the Chicago Police Department to combat organized crime in Prohibition-era Chicago. 

In 1927, at the height of the gang war between the Chicago Outfit and the North Side Gang, newly appointed Chief of Detectives William O'Connor convinced Mayor William "Big Bill" Thompson to authorize the creation of an elite police unit that would be able to match the firepower of the warring gangsters. Its handpicked volunteers, many former World War I veterans, would be armed with machine guns and armored cars. 

At its inception, O'Connor issued a general order to his men stating:
"Men, the war is on. We've got to show that society and the police department, and not a bunch of dirty rats, are running this town. It is the wish of the people of Chicago that you hunt down these criminals and kill them without mercy. Your cars are equipped with machine guns and you will meet the enemies of society on equal terms. See to it they don't have you pushing up daisies. Make them push up daisies. Shoot first and shoot to kill. If you kill a notorious feudist, you will get a handsome reward and win promotion. If you meet a car containing bandits, pursue them and fire. When I arrive on the scene, my hopes will be fulfilled if you have shot off the top of their car and killed every criminal inside it."

Despite O'Connor's bravado, the policy of a "shoot first, ask questions later" policy raised the concern of both the public and the underworld. Police officials, as well, feared the deaths of innocent bystanders in crossfire in the massive gun battles predicted. Gangster Al Capone was said to have referred to the group as "...another bunch of Irish bastards with guns." 

However, the squad failed to make a significant impact as poor intelligence and possible corruption within the police force itself would often have O'Connor's Gunners arriving at crime scenes well after the crime had taken place.

References
Sifakis, Carl. The Mafia Encyclopedia. New York: Da Capo Press, 2005. 

History of Chicago